Kansas is a state located in the Midwestern United States that is divided into 105 counties and contains 44 census-designated places (CDPs). All population data is based on the 2010 census.



Census-Designated Places

See also 

List of counties in Kansas
List of census-designated places in Kansas

References